The largest immigrant groups in Switzerland are those from Italy, 
Germany, Canada, the former Yugoslavia, Albania, Portugal and Turkey, including Turks and Kurds. Between them, these six groups account for about 1.5 million people, 60% of the Swiss population with immigrant background, or close to 20% of total Swiss population.

The current federal law of December 16, 2005, on foreigners (the Foreign Nationals Act) came into force on January 1, 2008, replacing the Federal Act on the Residence and Establishment of Foreigners of 1931.

Switzerland and Australia, with about a quarter of their population born outside the country, are the two countries with the highest proportion of immigrants in the western world, although who counts as an immigrant varies from country to country, and even between agencies within countries. Some countries naturalise immigrants easily, while others make it much more difficult, which means that such comparisons ought to be treated with caution.

Switzerland also has the highest Potential Net Migration Index of any European country by a large margin, at +150% (followed by Sweden at +78%)
according to a 2010 Gallup study; this means that out of an estimated 700 million potential migrants worldwide, about 12 million (150% of Swiss resident population) would name Switzerland as their most desired country of residence. Residents with migration background are twice as likely to be unemployed.

Racism

In the 2000s, domestic and international institutions expressed concern about what was perceived as an increase in xenophobia, particularly in some political campaigns. In reply to one critical report, the Federal Council noted that "racism unfortunately is present in Switzerland", but stated that the high proportion of foreign citizens in the country, as well as the generally unproblematic integration of foreigners, underlined Switzerland's openness. 
Follow-up study conducted in 2018 found that 59% considered racism a serious problem in Switzerland. 

The proportion of the population that has reported being targeted by racial discrimination has increased in recent years, from 10% in 2014 to almost 17% in 2018, according to the Federal Statistical Office. More recent studies shows that full integration is "out of reach for non-European migrants" while they represent only 20% of the foreigners living in Switzerland. Most affected areas are discrimination in employment, housing, education and social activities.

32% of the population say they have experienced some form of discrimination or violence in the past 5 years (2021). In 2021, the United Nations noticed the lack of clear Swiss legislation to tackle racism. Switzerland ratified the International Convention on the Elimination of All Forms of Racial Discrimination in 1993.

History

Industrialization and  banking made Switzerland prosperous by the late 19th century and began to attract significant numbers of migrant workers.
Free movement of population was established with neighbouring countries in the late 19th century, and as a consequence, there was an increase from 211,000 resident foreigners in 1880 (7.5% of total population) to 552,000 in 1910 (14.7% of total population).

There was net emigration of foreign residents during the World Wars era. The fraction of foreign residents fell to 10.4% by 1920, and to 5.1% by 1941. Immigration has picked up again after 1945. Beginning in the mid-1950s, immigration increased steeply, and the historical record of close to 15% foreigners prior to World War I was surpassed at some time during the 1960s.

Until the 1960s, the immigration policy remained largely liberal.  In the 1960s, rapid economic growth in Switzerland led to a large increase in the number of foreign residents. Because of this, the Federal Council enacted a regulation to limit the number of foreigners in each company.

In 1970, this per-company limit was replaced with a general limit for all recently arrived foreigners who were gainfully employed. In the 1970s, the number of foreigners decreased because of a period of recession. The proportion of foreigners to the total population, after growing steadily until 1974 and peaking at 16.8%, went down to 14.1% in 1979.

The favorable economic climate of the 1980s brought a renewed demand for labour, which was filled by foreign workers. This led to an increase in the proportion of foreign permanent residents, from 14.8% in 1980 to 18.1% in 1990. Between 1991 and 1998, the Federal Council replaced the previous system of admission with a binary system that distinguished between member states of the EU/EFTA and all other countries, which largely remains in force. With this reform, the possibility of recruiting unskilled workers from non-EU/EFTA countries was abolished, with the exception of family reunification and asylum applications.

In 1996, the Federal Council established a commission on immigration (the Hug Commission) to establish a new policy on immigration. Based on its work, a second commission was established to draft a new law on immigration. In the 1990s, the proportion of foreigners continued to rise, from 18.1% to 20.9%.

An agreement on the free movement of people, part of a series of bilateral agreements with the European Union, was signed on 21 June 1999 and approved on 21 May 2000 with 67.2% of the vote. The agreement on free movement entered into force on 1 June 2002. On 24 September 2006, the new law on foreigners was approved with 68% of votes in favor. The law came into force on 1 January 2008. Switzerland is also a party to the Schengen and Dublin agreements. They were signed on 26 October 2004 and the collaboration actually began on 12 December 2008.

In 2000, foreign permanent residents accounted for 20.9% of the population. In 2011, the percentage rose to 22.8%. In 2011, 22,551 people filed an application for asylum in Switzerland. There was a net immigration of foreigners taking permanent residence in Switzerland of 83,200 in 2007, and of 103,400 in 2008. Net immigration fell moderately in 2009, to 79,000, and continued to fall to 51,190 in 2012.

The admission of people from non-EU/EFTA countries is regulated by the Foreign Nationals Act, and is limited to skilled workers who are urgently required and are likely to integrate successfully in the long term. There are quotas established yearly: in 2012 it was 3,500 residency permits and 5,000 short-term permits.

In 2017, 1039 deportations were issued by courts. A third (348) of the deportees were of Balkan origins, 157 were North African and 93 were from West Africa. Of the remainder, 279 were EU citizens of which 138 were Romanians, 33 were French, 32 were Italian and a dozen Germans.

Referendums on immigration

There have been a number of ballot proposals to restrict immigration to Switzerland, starting already in the 20th century. Many of these were either rejected by popular vote, or not implemented (e.g. the people's initiative "against foreign infiltration and overpopulation of Switzerland" or the people's initiative "for a regulation of immigration"). Between 1993 and 2010, 18 referendums were held on topics related to the foreign population. These were approved in eleven cases, and rejected in seven. These included:
 1 December 1996, the People's initiative "against illegal immigration" was rejected by 53.7% of voters. 
 24 November 2002, the People's initiative on asylum was rejected by 50.1% of voters. The proposal asked the federal government to apply new elements of procedural law, criminal and welfare sector asylum, to make the Switzerland less attractive as a country of asylum, while respecting the obligations of international law.
 13 September 2004, the initiative "limitation of immigration from non-EU countries" failed because of insufficient number of signatures. The initiative provided that the number of immigrants and asylum seekers in a year could not exceed the number of people emigrated the previous year.
 1 June 2008, the people's initiative for democratic naturalisation was rejected with 63.8% of the vote. It intended to authorize municipalities to establish procedures to grant municipal citizenship.
 28 November 2010, the people's initiative for the deportation of criminal foreigners was accepted with 52.3% of the vote. Following the approval of the proposal, foreigners convicted of certain offenses or who were paid illegally social insurance benefits or social assistance lose the right of residence and are expelled from Switzerland.
 9 February 2014, the federal popular initiative "against mass immigration" was accepted by 50.3% of voters. The referendum aims to reduce immigration through quotas and limits the freedom of movement between Switzerland and the European Union.
  30 November 2014, Ecopop popular initiative "stop overpopulation", aiming at a cap on population growth of 0.2% p.a. This was defeated by 74% of votes.
 27 September 2020, For moderate immigration popular initiative aiming to end free movement with people in the EU, which would lead to the termination of the AFMP a bilateral agreement between Switzerland and the European Union was rejected by 62%.

Demographics
In 2009, a total number of 160,600 people immigrated to Switzerland, while a total number of 86,000 people left the country, leaving a net immigration of 74,600 people.
This number consists of a net number of 79,000 foreigners immigrating to Switzerland, and 4,500 Swiss citizens emigrating from Switzerland.

Net migration for the period 2005 to 2010:

Population growth in Switzerland is mostly due to immigration: in 2009, there have been 78,286 live births recorded (74% Swiss, 26% foreign nationalities), contrasting with 62,476 deaths (92% Swiss, 8% foreigners).
Thus, of the population growth rate of 1.1% during 2009, about 0.2% are due to births, and 0.9% due to immigration.

As of 2009, a total number of 1,714,000 foreign nationals were registered as residing in Switzerland, accounting for 22.0% of total population. Of these, 1,680,000 had permanent residence (excluding exchange students, seasonal workers and asylum seekers). Of these, 354,000 were born in Switzerland. Another 522,000 had resided in Switzerland for more than 15 years.
Swiss nationality law permits naturalization after a period of twelve years. 43,440 people were naturalized as Swiss citizens in 2009.

Permanent residents by nationality
In 2013 there were a total of 1,937,447 permanent residents (23.8% of the total population of 8.14 million) in Switzerland.  The majority (1.65 million, 85% of the total immigrants and 20.2% of the total population) came from Europe.  The following chart shows permanent resident numbers from selected regions and countries every 5 years.

Source:

Population of immigrant background
The definition of population of immigrant background includes all persons, regardless of their nationality, whose parents were born abroad. This definition includes first- and second-generation immigrants. In 2011, people of non-Swiss background made up 37.2% of the total resident population of Switzerland, with large differences between cantons.

See also
 Überfremdung
 List of countries by foreign-born population
 List of sovereign states and dependent territories by fertility rate

Notes and references

External links
Federal Office for Migration
official demographic data from the Federal Statistical Office

 

fr:Démographie de la Suisse#Immigration